Tameka Foster (born January 1, 1971) is an American fashion stylist. She has worked as a personal stylist for Lauryn Hill, Jay-Z, Toni Braxton, Ciara, Patti LaBelle, Nas, and her ex-husband Usher.

Career
Her professional career started with her employment as a sales associate and evolved to management positions. During her attendance at FIDM, Foster worked as a dresser at the Giorgio Armani fashion shows, and since then, she has styled numerous celebrities, including Jay-Z, Ciara, Nas, and Mary J. Blige.

Raymond's work as a stylist gained the attention of several television networks including, MTV, E! and Access Hollywood. She has also been featured in InStyle, People, Glamour, Vibe, Upscale and Essence Magazines.

Philanthropy

Foster is one of the co-founders of the 'Oakland Natives Giveback' nonprofit organization founded in 2007. Dr. Nyeisha DeWitt, Dee Dee Abdur-Rahim, and Tameka Raymond, all had a vision for their city and Oakland Natives Give Back (ONGB) was created. Driven by their passion to serve, their dream was to give back to the children in the community in which they were reared. The first ONGB initiative was the annual Attend and Achieve Back to School Rally at Oakland City Hall. The event was a fun-filled expo of sorts that created excitement and enthusiasm for the start of the school year, where children received fully loaded backpacks, public transportation vouchers, shoes, and school supplies at no cost. The success of the Back to School Rally deepened their desire to expand the reach and impact of ONGB. 
Foster is credited as the founder of charity organization, The Lost Ones Foundation, founded in 2009. The Lost Ones Foundation is a non-profit organization that lends a helping hand to adolescent girls from the ages of 12-18 who are in at risk environments.  

Foster's philanthropic work continued and in March of 2013 on what was to be her late son Kile's 12th birthday; she honored him by launching the 501c(3) nonprofit organization Kile's World Foundation. The Foundations mission is, "Gifting children with endless possibilities of creative endeavor through applied, fine and performing arts“ and intends to offer comprehensive art education to children ranging from ages 10‐17. 

On August 18, 2014, Foster joined the cast of VH1 spinoff Atlanta Exes. She starred alongside Christina Johnson, Torrei Hart, Sheree Buchanan and Monyetta Shaw.

In August of 2019, Foster with the help of her sons launched a 3-D animated series entitled, The Odd Life of Kile Lyles. The series began development in 2013 and is the story of a quirky 11-year-old boy experiencing the classic middle child syndrome. His day-to-day life of creating various gadgets that decorate his room and tree-house, changes drastically after a trip to an antique toy museum.

References

1971 births
Living people
People from Atlanta
People from Oakland, California
20th-century African-American women
20th-century African-American people
21st-century African-American women
21st-century African-American people
Participants in American reality television series